Memphis... Yes, I'm Ready is a 2017 studio album by American jazz singer Dee Dee Bridgewater released via OKeh label.

Background
Returning to her birthtown, Memphis, Tennessee (her family moved to Flint, MI, when she was three years old), Dee Dee Bridgewater embraces the music she grew up with, R&B and soul. Her father was also "a young on-air DJ with the moniker ‘Matt the Platter Cat.’" For the project she teamed up with Lawrence "Boo" Mitchell, owner of the Royal Studios in Memphis, where Mitchell's grandfather Willie already produced the music of Al Green, Ann Peebles, Quiet Elegance and others for his label Hi Records. The musicians were locals as well, such as saxophonist Kirk Whalum, guitarist Garry Goin, and Charles Hodges from The Hodges Brothers, the usual rhythm section of the Hi recordings. Featured as vocal backup were the Stax Music Academy.
The repertoire was meant to be as southern as the interpretation, it reached from "The Thrill Is Gone" (B.B. King), "Hound Dog" (Big Mama Thornton), and the gospel song "Take My Hand, Precious Lord" (Mahalia Jackson) to "Why Am I Treated So Bad!" (The Staple Singers), "Try a Little Tenderness" (Otis Redding), and two songs by Isaac Hayes and David Porter.

In her interview for The New York Times, when asked about her motivation to record the album, Bridgewater said "At this point I just want to give exposure to the things that I believe in. In that sense, I did this album for me." In her interview for Chicago Tribune Bridgewater also stated "I was looking for something to do that would be fun, that would be simple, that could make me dance, because I was getting toward the end of my mother’s transition and feeling a bit depressed."

Reception
Mark Deming of Allmusic noted that "with a top-shelf soul band cooking behind her, Dee Dee Bridgewater steps up as a top-shelf soul singer, smooth when she should be, good and gritty when she wants to be, and sounding tough, passionate, and firmly in command at all times... Dee Dee Bridgewater strips off some of the polish from her style on Memphis...Yes, I'm Ready without betraying her talent or best musical instincts, and this detour into Soul City is a treat that should please her fans, as well as anyone who digs Southern soul."

Mark McKergow of London Jazz News wrote: "Much of the repertoire is instantly recognisable [...] being given the Dee Dee treatment. The band assembled for the sessions offers fine support, [...] the predominant sound is low-down, bassy and utterly solid."

Track listing

Personnel
Band
Dee Dee Bridgewater – vocals
Kirk Whalum – tenor and baritone saxophone
Lannie McMillan, Kirk Smothers – tenor saxophone
Marc Franklin – trumpet
Kameron Whalum – trombone
John Stoddart – keyboards, vocal arrangements
Charles Hodges – Hammond organ
Garry Goin – guitar
Jackie Clark – bass
James Sexton – drums
Lawrence "Boo" Mitchell – cymbals, electric bongos, tambourine
Sharisse Norman, Candise Rayborn-Marshall, Kevin Whalum – background vocals
Stax Music Academy – vocals (background)

Production
Dee Dee Bridgewater, Kirk Whalum, Tulani Bridgewater Kowalski, Lawrence "Boo" Mitchell - producers
John Stoddart – associate producer
Ted Jensen – engineer
Tulani Bridgewater Kowalski – art direction, cover art, photography
Thomas Brodin – design
Rachel Ashley – photography
Dee Dee Bridgewater – liner notes

Chart positions

References

External links 

Dee Dee Bridgewater albums
2017 albums